St. Croix County is a county  in the U.S. state of Wisconsin. As of the 2020 census, the population was 93,536. Its county seat is Hudson. The county was created in 1840 (then in the Wisconsin Territory) and organized in 1849. St. Croix County is part of the Minneapolis-St. Paul-Bloomington, MN-WI Metropolitan Statistical Area. Between 2000 and 2010, it was the fastest-growing county in Wisconsin.

History

St. Croix County was created on August 3, 1840 by the legislature of the Wisconsin Territory. It was named after the river on its western border. Sources vary on the origin of the name; the St. Croix River may have been named after Monsieur St. Croix, an explorer who drowned at the mouth of the river late in the seventeenth century. Another account credits Father Hennepin with giving this region the French name Ste Croix (Holy Cross) because of the burial markers located at the mouth of the river.

La Pointe County (now extinct, see Bayfield County) was created from the northern portions of Wisconsin Territory's St. Croix County on February 19, 1845.  When Wisconsin was admitted into the union as a state on May 29, 1848, the territorial St. Croix County was further divided, with the territory from the Mississippi River to the current border of Minnesota continuing as de facto Wisconsin Territory until on March 3, 1849, it and unorganized federal territory lying north of Iowa were used in the creation of the Minnesota Territory. Itasca, Washington, Ramsey and Benton Counties were created by the Minnesota Territory on October 27, 1849 from the de facto Wisconsin Territory that had been separated from the Wisconsin Territory's La Pointe County.

The part of St. Croix County allocated to Wisconsin became the parental county to Pierce and Polk Counties, and formed significant portions of Dunn, Barron, Washburn and Burnett Counties.

On June 12, 1899, a deadly F5 tornado struck New Richmond. The tornado formed on the banks of the St. Croix River, south of Hudson. Moving to the northeast across St. Croix County, the tornado passed through the villages of Burkhardt and Boardman before striking New Richmond head on leveling the entire business district and half the town's residences. The storm continued on towards the northeast, narrowly missing the town of Deer Park before crossing into Polk County, where it again narrowly missed the towns of Clear Lake, Richardson and Clayton. Once the tornado passed into Barron County, it struck the village of Arland (No reported fatalities or serious injuries) before breaking up southwest of Barron. The tornado killed 117 people (Four at Boardman, two in Polk County and the rest at New Richmond), including at least 20 people who died from their injuries in the days after the storm. Largely in thanks to state aid and donations, most of the town was rebuilt by the following winter. Today, the tornado stands as the deadliest ever recorded in Wisconsin and the 9th deadliest tornado in U.S. history.

Geography

Major highways

Railroads
Canadian National
Union Pacific

Buses
List of intercity bus stops in Wisconsin

Airport
New Richmond Regional Airport (KRNH) serves the county and surrounding communities.

National protected area
 Saint Croix National Scenic Riverway (part)

Adjacent counties
 Polk County - north
 Barron County - northeast
 Dunn County - east
 Pierce County - south
 Washington County, Minnesota - west

Demographics

2020 census
As of the census of 2020, the population was 93,536. The racial makeup of the county was 92.2% White, 1.1% Asian, 0.7% Black or African American, 0.3% Native American, 1.1% from other races, and 4.5% from two or more races. Ethnically, the population was 2.9% Hispanic or Latino of any race.

2000 census
As of the census of 2000, there were 63,155 people, 23,410 households, and 16,948 families residing in the county. There were 24,265 housing units at an average density of 34 per square mile (13/km2). The racial makeup of the county was 97.85% White, 0.28% Black or African American, 0.25% Native American, 0.62% Asian, 0.02% Pacific Islander, 0.22% from other races, and 0.76% from two or more races.  0.76% of the population were Hispanic or Latino of any race. 34.4% were of German, 19.3% Norwegian, 8.2% Irish and 5.4% Swedish ancestry.

There were 23,410 households, out of which 38.00% had children under the age of 18 living with them, 61.60% were married couples living together, and 27.60% were non-families. 21.20% of all households were made up of individuals, and 7.30% had someone living alone who was 65 years of age or older.  The average household size was 2.66 and the average family size was 3.12.

In the county, the population was spread out, with 27.90% under the age of 18, 8.20% from 18 to 24, 32.20% from 25 to 44, 21.90% from 45 to 64, and 9.90% who were 65 years of age or older.  The median age was 35 years. For every 100 females there were 100.20 males.  For every 100 females age 18 and over, there were 98.50 males.

In 2017, there were 988 births, giving a general fertility rate of 59.0 births per 1000 women aged 15–44, the 25th lowest rate out of all 72 Wisconsin counties.

Communities

Cities
 Glenwood City
 Hudson (county seat)
 New Richmond
 River Falls (mostly in Pierce County)

Villages

 Baldwin
 Deer Park
 Hammond
 North Hudson
 Roberts
 Somerset
 Spring Valley (mostly in Pierce County)
 Star Prairie
 Wilson
 Woodville

Towns

 Baldwin
 Cady
 Cylon
 Eau Galle
 Emerald
 Erin Prairie
 Forest
 Glenwood
 Hammond
 Hudson
 Kinnickinnic
 Pleasant Valley
 Richmond
 Rush River
 Somerset
 Springfield
 St. Joseph
 Stanton
 Star Prairie
 Troy
 Warren

Census-designated places
 Emerald
 Houlton

Unincorporated communities

 Boardman
 Burkhardt
 Burkhardt Station
 Centerville
 Cylon
 Dahl
 Erin Corner
 Forest
 Glover
 Hatchville (partial)
 Hersey
 Huntington
 Jewett
 Johannesburg
 Northline
 Palmer
 Sono Junction
 Stanton
 Viking (partial)
 Wildwood

Politics

See also
 National Register of Historic Places listings in St. Croix County, Wisconsin

References

Further reading
 Johnson, Helen Sophia. Early History of St. Croix County, Wisconsin. Madison: University of Wisconsin, 1921.

External links
 St. Croix County government website
 St. Croix County map at the Wisconsin Department of Transportation

 
Minneapolis–Saint Paul
1849 establishments in Wisconsin
Populated places established in 1849